Ololygon ranki is a species of frog in the family Hylidae.
It is endemic to southeast Brazil.
Its natural habitats are subtropical or tropical moist lowland forests and rivers.
It is threatened by habitat loss.

References

ranki
Endemic fauna of Brazil
Amphibians described in 1987
Taxonomy articles created by Polbot